Companion Credit Union was an Australian credit union that operated between 1975 and 2010, and became part of Beyond Bank Australia.

History
In 1974 a group of Hunter Valley Coal miners began talks with the Credit Union League in Sydney, who approved the commencement of a new Credit Union.

On 6 January 1975 the Northern Mineworkers Credit Union opened its doors for the first time. Originally the first office was a backroom at the Northern United Mineworkers Federation Headquarters in Newcastle.

In 1988 the credit union changed its name from the Northern Mineworkers Credit Union to Companion Credit Union and opened its doors to the general public, so that anyone could be a member.

In 2009, credit union members voted to merge with Community CPS Australia and the merger took effect on 1 January 2010.

On 1 August 2013 it became a mutual savings bank called Beyond Bank Australia.

References

External links
Beyond Bank Australia

Credit unions of Australia